Nagtoralik-45 (also known as N-45) is a Greenlandic sports club based in Paamiut, Sermersooq, Greenland. The club was founded in 1945 and competes in sports such as football, futsal, handball, and badminton. Their football team competes annually in qualifying for the Coca-Cola GM, Greenland's men's football championship.

References

External links 
Club Facebook Page

Football clubs in Greenland